General elections were held in newly independent Bangladesh on 7 March 1973. The result was a victory for the Bangladesh Awami League, who won 293 of the 300 seats, including eleven constituencies where they were elected unopposed without a vote. Voter turnout was 55%.

Though the Awami League was already the clear favourite before the elections, Sheikh Mujib's government put major effort into winning every seat. This led to a nearly complete obliteration of the opposition, with most of the leadership of opposition parties failing to win seats, including Major Jalil (Jatiya Samajtantrik Dal), Rashed Khan Menon, Kazi Zafar Ahmed and Aleem al-Razee (National Awami Party (Bhashani)), and Suranjit Sengupta (National Awami Party (Muzaffar)).

Conduct
Prior to the elections, some opposition candidates in marginal constituencies were kidnapped by Awami League supporters before they were able to submit their nomination papers. In some constituencies where opposition candidates were leading in the vote count, counting was abruptly stopped, ballot boxes were stuffed with fake papers, and the Awami League candidates were declared winners amid the strong presence of Awami League volunteers.

However, it was generally believed that Awami League, with the appeal of its leader Sheikh Mujib and its instrumental role in the independence of Bangladesh, would have easily won the elections without manipulation.

Results

Vote share by district

See also
List of members of the 1st Jatiya Sangsad

References

General
General elections in Bangladesh
Bangladesh